Brahim Hemdani (born 15 March 1978) is an Algerian former professional footballer who played as a defensive midfielder.

Club career
Hemdani was born in Colombes, Hauts-de-Seine. He started his career with Cannes, where he spent two seasons. He later transferred to RC Strasbourg Alsace, spending three seasons with the club. He then joined Marseille, which he helped reach the UEFA Cup final in 2004.

Hemdani then joined Rangers on 14 June 2005 on a Bosman transfer and signed a four-year contract. He suffered from injury problems during his first season, waiting until late October to make his debut against Dundee United. Hemdani was a regular in the side from then on and helped the club reach the last 16 of the Champions League for the first time in their history. The season ended with the side finishing third in the league and trophyless. The following summer, Paul Le Guen took over as manager and Hemdani began the 2006–07 season in midfield but was moved to the centre of defence.

Hemdani scored his first goal for Rangers midway through that season, a shot from outside the box to equalise in the 88th minute of an Old Firm game on 17 December 2006. His second goal came in similar circumstances in a UEFA Cup match in March 2007, against CA Osasuna, scoring to equalise in injury time.

On 16 April 2007, Hemdani was named Rangers Player of the Year at an award ceremony, voted for by the club's fans. He made his 100th appearance for Rangers on 13 March 2008 in a UEFA Cup match against Werder Bremen, the club went on to reach the final that season, which Hemdani played the full 90 minutes of. However, this turned out to be his last match for Rangers as the 2008–09 season saw Hemdani frozen out of the first team. He left on 1 June 2009 having made a total of 108 appearances and scoring twice.

International career
Hemdani declined the chance to be included as part of the Algeria national squad on several occasions in the past. However, in February 2008 he had a change of heart and decided to play for Algeria. Hemdani made his Algerian debut in a 2010 World Cup qualifier against Senegal on 31 May 2008.

Personal life
Hemdani's family are originally from Larbaâ Nath Irathen, near Tizi Ouzou, in the Kabylie region of Algeria and he spends a significant amount of time there every year.

Career statistics

Club
Sources:

Honours
Rangers
 Scottish League Cup: 2008
 Scottish Cup: 2008, 2009
 Scottish first-tier League Championships: 2009
 UEFA Cup Final Runners up: 2007–08

Marseille
 UEFA Cup Final Runners up: 2003–04

Individual
 Rangers F.C. Player of the Year: 2007

References

External links
 
 

1978 births
Living people
Sportspeople from Colombes
French people of Kabyle descent
Footballers from Hauts-de-Seine
Association football midfielders
Algerian footballers
Algeria international footballers
Ligue 1 players
Scottish Premier League players
Racing Club de France Football players
AS Cannes players
RC Strasbourg Alsace players
Olympique de Marseille players
Rangers F.C. players
Kabyle people
Expatriate footballers in Scotland